Carbohydrate sulfotransferase 10 is an enzyme that in humans is encoded by the CHST10 gene.

Cell surface carbohydrates modulate a variety of cellular functions and are typically synthesized in a stepwise manner. HNK1ST plays a role in the biosynthesis of HNK1 (see MIM 151290), a neuronally expressed carbohydrate that contains a sulfoglucuronyl residue.[supplied by OMIM]

References

External links

Further reading